Mangleticornia is a monotypic genus of flowering plants belonging to the family Amaranthaceae. The only species is Mangleticornia ecuadorensis.

Its native range is Ecuador to Peru.

References

Amaranthaceae
Amaranthaceae genera
Monotypic Caryophyllales genera